Phenix is a town in Charlotte County, Virginia, United States. The population was 226 at the 2010 census.

Geography
Phenix is located in western Charlotte County at  (37.080841, -78.747183), along Virginia State Route 40, which leads east  to Charlotte Court House, the county seat, and west  to Brookneal.

Demographics

As of the census of 2000, there were 200 people, 78 households, and 62 families living in the town. The population density was 173.4 people per square mile (67.1/km²). There were 94 housing units at an average density of 81.5 per square mile (31.6/km²). The racial makeup of the town was 91.50% White, 8.00% African American, and 0.50% from two or more races.

There were 78 households, out of which 25.6% had children under the age of 18 living with them, 66.7% were married couples living together, 11.5% had a female householder with no husband present, and 20.5% were non-families. 19.2% of all households were made up of individuals, and 11.5% had someone living alone who was 65 years of age or older. The average household size was 2.56 and the average family size was 2.89.

In the town, the population was spread out, with 18.5% under the age of 18, 10.5% from 18 to 24, 22.0% from 25 to 44, 25.5% from 45 to 64, and 23.5% who were 65 years of age or older. The median age was 44 years. For every 100 females there were 90.5 males. For every 100 females age 18 and over, there were 85.2 males.

The median income for a household in the town was $30,000, and the median income for a family was $34,583. Males had a median income of $40,938 versus $14,063 for females. The per capita income for the town was $18,572. About 9.8% of families and 7.5% of the population were below the poverty line, including none of those under the age of eighteen and 16.7% of those sixty five or over.

References

External links
 Town website

Towns in Charlotte County, Virginia